Weidenbach (German for willow creek) may refer to:

 Weidenbach, Bavaria, in the district of Ansbach, Bavaria
 Weidenbach, Rhein-Lahn, in the district Rhein-Lahn, Rhineland-Palatinate
 Weidenbach, Vulkaneifel, in the district Vulkaneifel, Rhineland-Palatinate
 Lisa Weidenbach (born 1961), American distance runner

See also
 Weisenbach, a municipality in Baden-Württemberg, Germany
 Weizenbach, a river in Bavaria, Germany

Jewish surnames